This is a list of women artists who were born in South Korea or whose artworks are closely associated with that country.

A
Jun Ahn (active since 2006), fine arts photographer

B
Bang Hai Ja (born 1937), abstract painter, stained-glass artist and calligrapher
Lee Bul (born 1964), installation artist

C
Mina Cheon (born 1973), new media artist
Young-ja Cho (born 1951), sculptor
Jung Hee Choi (active since 1999), artist, musician, based in New York
Choi Kyung-ah (born 1969), manhwa artist
Kyung-hwa Choi-ahoi (born 1967), graphic artist and academic based in Hamburg
Chunghi Choo (born 1938), jewellery designer, metalsmith

H
Young Gi Han (born 1984), contemporary artist
Kyung-hee Hong (born 1954), sculptor
Ran Hwang (born 1960), mixed media artist working with buttons, pins and thread

J
Yun-kyung Jeong (active since 2005), painter, based in London

K
Kang Kyung-ok (born 1965), manhwa artist
Kim Yik-yung (born 1935), ceramist
Kimsooja (born 1957), multidisciplinary artist
Koo Jeong-a (born 1967), installation artist

L
Lee Bul (born 1964), sculptor, installation artist
Chang-Jin Lee, visual artist
JeeYoung Lee (born 1983), contemporary artist
Lee Hyeon-sook (born 1971), manhwa artist
Lee So-young (artist) (born 1973), manhwa artist
Lee Young-you (born 1977), manhwa artist
Minouk Lim (born 1968), multimedia artist

M
massstar (active since 2014), webtoon artist
Jiha Moon (born 1973), contemporary artist
Moon Kyungwon (born 1969), painter, video artist
Kang Myung-sun (born 1974), design artist working with mother-of-pearl

N
Na Hye-sok (1896–1948), painter, writer

P
Park Naehyeon (1920–1976), painter

R
Seund Ja Rhee (1918–2009), painter, printmaker, ceramist
Jewyo Rhii (born 1971), artist, writer
Rhim Ju-yeon (born 1976), manhwa artist

S
Shin Saimdang (1504–1551) writer, painter, calligraphist
SEO (artist) (born 1977), painter, based in Berlin
Sanghee Song (born 1970), animator, video artist

W
Won Soo-yeon (born 1961), manhwa artist

Y
Haegue Yang (born 1971), artist working with household objects
Niki Yang (active since 2008), animator, voice actress
Younhee Yang (born 1977), painter
Anicka Yi (born 1971), conceptual artist working with fragrances
Yun Mi-kyung (born 1980), manhwa artist

-
South Korean women
Artists
Artists, women